Broad Recognition is an online undergraduate feminist magazine at Yale University. It covers politics, media, arts, and current events. Since its founding, members have been involved in notable feminist activism in the University.

Founding
Broad Recognition was started in 2005 as an independent feminist blog by students Sabrina Manville and Della Santilles, both class of 2006. Later it was updated by Adda Birnir ’07, Maggie Doherty ’07, Basha Rubin ’07, and other contributors. In 2009, the blog expanded into an online feminist magazine.

Role in the Delta Kappa Epsilon Controversy
On October 13, 2010, the Yale chapter of Delta Kappa Epsilon participated in a misogynistic display for the fraternity's rush process. Fraternity brothers and young men rushing the fraternity paraded on Yale's Old Campus chanting "No means yes; yes means anal." Broad Recognition reliably covered the event and its fallout. The Yale chapter's president apologized for the action, but Broad Recognition was instrumental in pushing for a greater administrative response, pointing out that the activity was "hate speech." Broad Recognition also called for accountability from the Yale Daily News for a sexist piece that the opinion editors had published in the wake of the chanting, dismissing the Women's Center and Broad Recognition as overreacting—and the News' subsequent faux-apology.

On May 17, 2011, Yale College Dean Mary Miller publicly released the disciplinary action decided for DKE, which included punishments of particular participants and a suspension of activities on Yale campus by DKE for five years.

Title IX suit against Yale
In March 2011 a group of 16 Yale students and recent graduates, including three Broad Recognition editors, Hannah Zeavin, Alexandra Brodsky, and Presca Ahn, filed a complaint against the University for a hostile sexual climate. The complaint led to an investigation by the U.S. Department of Education’s Office for Civil Rights under Title IX, into the University's policies toward sexual assault and harassment. In response, in June 2011 Yale formed a Title IX steering committee to address complaints of sexual misconduct.

References

External links
 

Feminist magazines
Magazines established in 2009
Magazines published in Connecticut
Mass media in New Haven, Connecticut
Online magazines published in the United States
Political magazines published in the United States
Student magazines published in the United States
Women's magazines published in the United States